Arnold Wiltz (June 18, 1889 – March 13, 1937) was an American painter. His work was part of the painting event in the art competition at the 1932 Summer Olympics.

References

1889 births
1937 deaths
20th-century American painters
American male painters
Olympic competitors in art competitions
People from Berlin
20th-century American male artists